William T. Tilden Middle School is a historic middle school located in the Paschall neighborhood of Philadelphia, Pennsylvania. It is part of the School District of Philadelphia. The building was designed by Irwin T. Catharine and built in 1926–1927. It is a three-story, 11 bay, brick and limestone building in the Late Gothic Revival-style. It features projecting end bays with one-story entrances, brick piers, and a crenellated parapet.

The building was added to the National Register of Historic Places in 1986.

References

External links

School buildings on the National Register of Historic Places in Philadelphia
Gothic Revival architecture in Pennsylvania
School buildings completed in 1927
School District of Philadelphia
Southwest Philadelphia
Public middle schools in Pennsylvania
1927 establishments in Pennsylvania